Chupaca is a town in central Peru, capital of the province Chupaca in the region Junín.

References

External links
  Municipal website

Populated places in the Junín Region